Calkins is a surname. Notable people with the surname include:

Blaine Calkins, Conservative Member of Parliament in the Canadian House of Commons
Blean Calkins, sports radio broadcaster
Buzz Calkins, former Indy Racing League driver
Dick Calkins or Lt. Dick Calkins, comic strip artist
Earnest Elmo Calkins, American advertising executive
Gary Nathan Calkins (1869–1943), American zoologist
George H. Calkins, American physician and politician
Homer D. Calkins, American environmentalist
Hugh Calkins, member of the Harvard Corporation from 1969 to 1984
Irving Calkins, American sport shooter
Mary Whiton Calkins, American philosopher and psychologist
Michelle Calkins, Canadian synchronized swimmer and coach
William H. Calkins, U.S. Representative from Indiana

See also
Calkin (surname)
Calkins, Montana